Bacula is a genus of medium-sized sea snails, marine gastropod molluscs in the family Eulimidae.

Species
There are three known species within the genus Bacula:
 Bacula lamberti (Souverbie, 1875)
 Bacula morisyuichiroi (Habe, 1968)
 Bacula striolata H. Adams & A. Adams, 1863

References

External links
 To World Register of Marine Species

Eulimidae
Gastropod genera